Donald Towe Jones (January 24, 1932 – November 5, 2004) was an American-Dutch actor, singer and dancer; born in Harlem, he went to the Netherlands in his early twenties and became one of the first Dutch black stars.

Biography
Born in Harlem, New York Jones originally trained to be an advertising designer. He moved to the Netherlands in 1954 with a dance troupe. He was hired by a cabaret company and began a career singing, acting, and dancing. He was hired for the very first Dutch television show, the 1950s television hit  (written by Annie M.G. Schmidt), in which he played Dinky Henderson, who sings the  song "Ik zou je het liefste in een doosje willen doen," a Dutch hit and now one of the standards in the musical comedy genre. This made Jones the first black star in the Netherlands.

Jones was one of the artists who recorded the song Shalom from Holland (written by Simon Hammelburg and Ron Klipstein) as a token of solidarity to the Israeli people, threatened by missiles from Iraq, during the first Gulf War in 1991.

Personal life
He married Dutch actress ; they were the first well-known mixed couple in the country. Their son,  (born 1963), went on to become an actor and comedian.

Death
Donald Jones died in Amsterdam of a heart attack on November 5, 2004 at the age of 72. He was cremated and the ashes were placed at the Westgaarde Cemetery.

References

External links

1932 births
2004 deaths
People from Harlem
Dutch male film actors
Dutch male television actors
20th-century Dutch male singers
Dutch male dancers
American emigrants to the Netherlands
Naturalised citizens of the Netherlands
Dutch people of African-American descent
American male film actors
American male television actors
American male dancers
African-American male actors
20th-century African-American male singers
African-American male dancers
20th-century American male actors
20th-century Dutch male actors
20th-century American male singers
20th-century American singers